The Park Avenue Houses in New York City were built in 1909. They were added to the National Register of Historic Places in 1980.

The Park Avenue Houses are listed together on the National Register of Historic Places and individually on the New York City Landmark Preservation Commission registry. They are

680 Park Avenue - Percy R. Pyne House (now the Americas Society)
684 Park Avenue - Oliver D. Filley House (now the Queen Sofía Spanish Institute)
686 Park Avenue - William Sloane House (now the Italian Cultural Institute of New York)
690 Park Avenue - Henry P. Davison House (now the Italian Consulate General)

See also
 National Register of Historic Places listings in Manhattan from 59th to 110th Streets
 List of New York City Designated Landmarks in Manhattan from 59th to 110th Streets

References

Houses on the National Register of Historic Places in Manhattan
Houses in Manhattan
Residential buildings completed in 1909
McKim, Mead & White buildings
Park Avenue